Vecchia approximation is a Gaussian processes approximation technique originally developed by Aldo Vecchia, a statistician at United States Geological Survey. It is one of the earliest attempts to use Gaussian processes in high-dimensional settings. It has since been extensively generalized giving rise to many contemporary approximations.

Intuition 

Vecchia's approximation takes the form, for example,

Of course one could have alternatively chosen the approximation

and so use of the approximation requires some knowledge of which events are close to conditionally independent given others. Moreover, we could have chosen
a different ordering, for example

Fortunately, in many cases there are good heuristics making decisions about how to construct the approximation.

More technically, general versions of the approximation lead to a sparse Cholesky factor of the precision matrix. Using the standard Cholesky factorization produces entries which can be interpreted as conditional correlations with zeros indicating no independence (since the model is Gaussian). These independence relations can be alternatively expressed using graphical models and there exist theorems linking graph structure and vertex ordering with zeros in the Cholesky factor. In particular, it is known that independencies that are encoded in a moral graph lead to Cholesky factors of the precision matrix that have no fill-in.

Formal description

The problem 

In this context the two most common inference tasks include evaluating the likelihood

Original formulation 

The original Vecchia method starts with the observation that the joint density of observations  can be written as a product of conditional distributions

Vecchia approximation assumes instead that for some 

Vecchia also suggested that the above approximation be applied to observations that are reordered lexicographically using their spatial coordinates. Many of its deficiencies were addressed by the subsequent generalizations.

General formulation 

While conceptually simple, the assumption of the Vecchia approximation often proves to be fairly restrictive and inaccurate. This inspired important generalizations and improvements introduced in the basic version over the years: the inclusion of latent variables, more sophisticated conditioning and better ordering. Different special cases of the general Vecchia approximation can be described in terms of how these three elements are selected.

Latent variables 

To describe extensions of the Vecchia method in its most general form, define  and notice that for  it holds that like in the previous section
 

Ordering 

It has been widely noted that the original lexicographic ordering based on coordinates when  is two-dimensional produces poor results. More recently another orderings have been proposed, some of which ensure that points are ordered in a quasi-random fashion. Highly scalable, they have been shown to also drastically improve accuracy.

Conditioning 

Similar to the basic version described above, for a given ordering a general Vecchia approximation can be defined as

where . Therefore, one might instead consider sets  and  such that  and express  as

Software 

Several packages have been developed which implement some variants of the Vecchia approximation. 
 GPvecchia is an R package available through CRAN (R programming language) which implements most versions of the Vecchia approximation
 GpGp is an R package available through CRAN (R programming language) which implements an scalable ordering method for spatial problems which greatly improves accuracy.
 spNNGP is an R package available through CRAN (R programming language) which implements the latent Vecchia approximation
 pyMRA is a Python package available through pyPI implementing Multi-resolution approximation, a special case of the general Vecchia method used in dynamic state-space models
 meshed is an R package available through CRAN (R programming language) which implements Bayesian spatial or spatiotemporal multivariate regression models based a latent Meshed Gaussian Process (MGP) using Vecchia approximations on partitioned domains

Notes

Geostatistics
Computational science
Computational statistics
Statistical software